Jahan Jaaeyega Hamen Paaeyega is a 2007 Indian Hindi-language romantic thriller film directed by Janmendra Ahuja and produced by Dr Lakhan Sinhaa. The film stars Govinda, Sakshi Shivanand, Sharat Saxena, Kader Khan and Mukesh Rishi in the main casts. It was released on 6 July 2007 although it was filmed many years back.

Synopsis
Karan (Govinda) loves Anju (Sakshi Sivanand), but when she gets murdered, Karan becomes the main accused and lands up in prison. Innocent, he breaks out of jail to find out the truth. He meets two young boys, Tito and Toni (Vinay Anand and Krishna Abhishek), who realize that Karan is a convict-on-the-run and there is a huge prize on his head. Karan offers to help them get the money but wants them to help him trace Anju's murderers first. With their help, Karan learns that a group of people was involved in Anju's murder. He starts eliminating them one by one.

Cast
Govinda as Karan / Bobby Singh / Sher Khan
Sakshi Shivanand as Anju V. Khanna
Sharat Saxena as Master
Mukesh Rishi as Inspector Rajat
Kader Khan as Mr. Khanna
Vinay Anand as Tito
Krishna Abhishek as Tony
Adnan Alam as kidnapped kid

Songs
"Na Chhoo Na" - Udit Narayan, Sunidhi Chauhan
"Banda Ye Janbaaz Hai" - Aadesh Shrivastava
"Deewana Mai Deewana" - Aadesh Shrivastava, Sneha Pant
"Sala Gaya Kam Se" - Aadesh Shrivastava

Movie review

Critical reception

Taran Adarsh gave the movie only 2/5 star and wrote - " Sinha's JAAHAN JAYEGA HAMEN PAAYEGA actually tests the patience of the viewer. Fine, you don't expect a riveting storyline from a film of this genre, but you definitely expect laughs, don't you? You expect to be entertained, don't you? Alas, what you get to see is definitely not good, not even bad, it's verrry boring!"

AOL India (Noyon Jyoti Parasara) also gave it a thumbs down and said, Sinha needs to get his act right. If songs are what he wants, he might as well direct videos. Making a film just for the heck of it is a waste of lot of time and money."[1]

On the box office, Jaahan Jaayega Hamen Paayega is doing poorly, grossing only 1,88,45,063(rs) in India and £50,342 in UK

Box office
The film was a major disappointment at the box office. It made about a circuit of 45 million. It was declared not a flop but a 'disaster' at Box Office Mojo.

References

External links
 
 Jahan Jaayega Hamen Paayega: Cast & Crew @ Bollywood Hungama

2000s Hindi-language films
2007 films
Films scored by Aadesh Shrivastava
Indian romantic thriller films
Indian films about revenge
2000s romantic thriller films